Minnesota State Highway 91 (MN 91) is a  highway in southwest Minnesota. It runs from Lyon County Road L14 at the Iowa state line near Ellsworth northward to State Highway 23 at Russell.

Route description
Highway 91 serves as a north–south route in southwest Minnesota between Russell, Lake Wilson, Adrian, Ellsworth, and the Iowa state line. It is an important corridor for north–south truck traffic in the region.

Highway 91 is also known as Broadway Street in Ellsworth. The route follows Maine Avenue in Adrian. It follows College Avenue and Minnesota Avenue in Lake Wilson.

Highway 91 has an interchange with Interstate 90 at Adrian.

The route is legally defined as Legislative Route 91 in the Minnesota Statutes.

History
Highway 91 was authorized in 1933. Previously, Ellsworth and Lismore in Nobles County had been connected via a gravel road constructed .

In July 1938, a bridge near Chandler was washed out by floods and was replaced with a  detour.

In 1942, only a portion of Highway 91 north of Adrian was paved.  Highway 91 was paved between Adrian and the Iowa state line by 1953.  The remainder of the route was paved by 1960.

A  section of the route underwent extensive rehabilitation from 2019 to 2020. The project included repaving of the roadway, along with bridge and box culvert replacement and an upgrade of the sidewalks in Lake Wilson. The cost of the project was reduced by bundling the separate projects, which spanned the three counties through which the route travels, into a single bid.

The bridge over Interstate 90 in Adrian was replaced in 2021.

Major intersections

References

External links

091
Transportation in Nobles County, Minnesota
Transportation in Murray County, Minnesota
Transportation in Lyon County, Minnesota